Sidi Laaroussi is a small town and rural commune in Essaouira Province of the Marrakech-Tensift-Al Haouz region of Morocco. At the time of the 2004 census, the commune had a total population of 13202 people living in 2078 households.

The average annual temperature is about 74 °F, with the hottest month being August, versus the coldest month, January. Annually, it rains about 14 inches, most of it occurring during November, and the least of it from June.

References

Populated places in Essaouira Province
Rural communes of Marrakesh-Safi